Shaffers Crossing is an unincorporated community in Jefferson County, in the U.S. state of Colorado.

The community was named after Samuel Shaffer, the original owner of the site.

References

Unincorporated communities in Jefferson County, Colorado
Unincorporated communities in Colorado